Hlöðufell is a tuya volcano, located about 10 km southwest of Langjökull, Iceland. Hlöðufell is 1188 metres above sea level, and was formed when lava erupted through Langjökull (which was larger during the last ice age) during the Pleistocene.

See also
Volcanism of Iceland
List of volcanoes in Iceland

External links
 

Tuyas of Iceland
Pleistocene volcanoes
West Volcanic Zone of Iceland